William Godward (born 15 April 1984) is an Australian sports shooter. He competed in the Men's 10 metre air rifle event at the 2012 Summer Olympics and the Men's three position rifle event at the 2016 Summer Olympics.

References

External links
 

1984 births
Living people
Australian male sport shooters
Olympic shooters of Australia
Shooters at the 2012 Summer Olympics
Shooters at the 2016 Summer Olympics
Sportspeople from Townsville
21st-century Australian people